William Joseph Poupore (April 29, 1846 – August 17, 1918) was a Canadian politician.

Born in Allumette Island, Canada East, the son of William Poupore and Susan McAdams, Poupore was educated on Allumette Island and at Ottawa College where he studied law for two years. He was a mill owner, contractor, and lumberer. In 1870, Poupore married his first cousin Eleonor, the daughter of John Poupore. He was mayor of Chichester from 1872 to 1882 and was warden of the county of Pontiac from 1881 to 1882. He was elected to the Legislative Assembly of Quebec for the electoral district of Pontiac in a by-election held in 1882. A Quebec Conservative, he was re-elected in 1886 and in 1890 by acclamation. He was defeated in 1892. He was elected to the House of Commons of Canada for the electoral district of Pontiac in the 1896 federal election. A Conservative, he did not run for reelection in 1900. Poupore died in Westmount at the age of 72 and was buried in the Notre Dame des Neiges Cemetery.

References
 
 

1846 births
1918 deaths
Conservative Party of Canada (1867–1942) MPs
Mayors of places in Quebec
Members of the House of Commons of Canada from Quebec
Conservative Party of Quebec MNAs
Burials at Notre Dame des Neiges Cemetery